Davud Tuma (born Davud Gügör; 16 May 1996) is a German professional footballer who plays as a forward for Rot Weiss Ahlen.

Personal life
Born in Germany to parents of Armenian descent, David changed his last name from the Turkish given "Gügör" to his families original last name "Tuma".

References

1996 births
Living people
People from Gütersloh
Sportspeople from Detmold (region)
German footballers
German people of Armenian descent
Association football forwards
Rot-Weiß Oberhausen players
FC Carl Zeiss Jena players
Hallescher FC players
Chemnitzer FC players
Kickers Offenbach players
Rot Weiss Ahlen players
Regionalliga players
3. Liga players
Footballers from North Rhine-Westphalia
Assyrian footballers
German people of Assyrian/Syriac descent